Busan Metro Line 3 is a line of the Busan Metro system. The line was built from 1997 to 2005 and opened on November 28, 2005. The line is 18.3 kilometers long, and has 17 stations. Each train of the line has 4 cars. Line 3's trains have an open gangway between each car (just like Line 4), giving an unblocked view of the whole train from one end to the other. The line was originally planned to have a main line from Suyeong station to Daejeo station with a second phase that splits from Minam Station. However, the second phase split into a separate line and is now called Line 4.

Due to the "Daegu Subway Fire" in 2003, all of Line 3's stations were built with platform screen doors. Line 3 was one of the first metro lines in both Korea and the world to have platform screen doors equipped at every station.

Line 3 greatly increased the efficiency of the entire Busan Metro system. While Line 2 connects the Deokcheon region to the Suyeong region in a rather curved, 'southernly' way, Line 3 connects the two areas in a more straight line. For example, a person living in the Yangsan area would not use the whole line 2 to reach the Haeundae area; instead, he or she would transfer at Deokcheon Station to Line 3, and transfer back to Line 2 at Suyeong Station. Line 3 also increased the efficiency of traveling between Deokcheon and Yeonsandong area, along with the Minam and Dongnae area.

A ride through the entire line takes about 34 minutes.

List of stations

External links

Busan Transportation Corporation's official website

3
Railway lines opened in 2005